"Slow Down" is a song co-written and recorded by American country music artist Lacy J. Dalton.  It was released in May 1982 as the first single from the album 16th Avenue.  The song reached number 13 on the Billboard Hot Country Singles & Tracks chart.  The song was written by Dalton, Billy Sherrill and Mark Sherrill.

Chart performance

References

1982 singles
Lacy J. Dalton songs
Songs written by Billy Sherrill
Song recordings produced by Billy Sherrill
Columbia Records singles
1982 songs
Songs written by Lacy J. Dalton
Songs written by Mark Sherrill